The Lumpkin Commercial Historic District in Lumpkin, Georgia is a  historic district which was listed on the National Register of Historic Places in 1982.  The listing included 18 contributing buildings.

The district includes Lumpkin's courthouse square, with its monument to Confederate dead, and the two-story brick Classical Revival Stewart County Courthouse (separately listed on the National Register in 1980).

It also includes commercial buildings on the streets which define the square: Main, Broad, Cotton, and Mulberry Streets, in the eight blocks surrounding the square.

It includes the separately listed Bedingfield Inn (NRHP-listed in 1973).

References

Confederate States of America monuments and memorials in Arkansas
Historic districts on the National Register of Historic Places in Georgia (U.S. state)
National Register of Historic Places in Stewart County, Georgia
Greek Revival architecture in Georgia (U.S. state)
Victorian architecture in Georgia (U.S. state)